The Trent, Ancholme and Grimsby Railway was a railway line in north Lincolnshire which commenced at an end on junction with the South Yorkshire Railway where that railway crossed the River Trent near the village of Gunhouse. This was known as Gunhouse Junction but the village has become known as "Gunness". The line ran for about 14 miles (22.5 km) through Frodingham to Wrawby Junction near Barnetby and included railway stations at Appleby, and Elsham. The line also included two branches to Gunness and Gunhouse Wharf on the River Trent. The line was opened on 1 October 1866.

The line was worked, and later absorbed into by the Manchester, Sheffield and Lincolnshire Railway. The M. S. & L. R. became the Great Central Railway and on grouping to the LNER. The 14 mile main line is still open and is heavily used, the two branches have closed.

Acts

The Trent, Ancholme, and Grimsby Railway Act, 1861 (24 & 25 Vic., Cap.156);  An Act to authorize the Construction in Lincolnshire of a Railway from the River Trent across the River Ancholme to the Manchester, Sheffield, and Lincolnshire Railway. 

The Trent, Ancholme, and Grimsby Railway Act, 1862 (25 & 26 Vic., Cap.129); An Act to authorize the South Yorkshire Railway and River Dun Company, and the Manchester, Sheffield, and Lincolnshire Railway Company to contribute Funds towards and to acquire the Undertaking of the Trent, Alcholme, and Grimsby Railway Company

The Trent, Ancholme and Grimsby Railway Act, 1864 (27 & 28 Vic., Cap.65); An Act to enable the Trent, Ancholme, and Grimsby Railway Company to raise further Money

The Manchester Sheffield and Lincolnshire railway and Cheshire Lines Act, 1882. (45 & 46 Vic. Cap.116);

Further reading

External links

Great Central Railway
1866 establishments in England